Teo Bee Yen (born 1950 in Fujian, China) is a photographer from Singapore.

References

Singaporean photographers
1950 births
Living people
Recipients of the Cultural Medallion